Sorel-en-Vimeu is a commune in Somme, Hauts-de-France, France.

Geography

Population

See also
Communes of the Somme department

References

External links

  The community of communes of Hallencourt 

Communes of Somme (department)